White Crown Mountain is a mountain in the Princess Margaret Range on Axel Heiberg Island, Nunavut, Canada. It is located on the southwestern edge of the Muller Icecap and is surrounded by glaciers.

References

Arctic Cordillera
Two-thousanders of Nunavut